Gentleman Ghost (James "Jim" Craddock), introduced as Ghost, and also known as Gentleman Jim, is a supervillain appearing in works published by DC Entertainment. Created by writer Robert Kanigher and artist Joe Kubert, the character first appeared in Flash Comics #88 (October 1947).

Fictional character biography

Earth-Two
Originally, on Earth-Two just called "Ghost," this criminal clashed twice with Hawkman and Hawkgirl, claiming to be an actual ghost. Hawkman refused to believe it, and the couple's investigation seemed to support that, but the original story left the truth ambiguous. In their next encounter, it was confirmed that the supposed ghost was a mundane criminal named James "Jim" Craddock who had used special tricks and gadgets to pretend to be a ghost.

Post-Crisis
In Post-Crisis continuity, James "Jim" Craddock is the son of an English gentleman who abandoned both Jim and his mother, forcing them into poverty. Craddock grew up to become a notorious highwayman and robber who terrorized England in the 19th century under the name "Gentleman Jim", after a prophecy from a gypsy said he would be a highwayman. He encountered the ghosts of other highwaymen and Dick Turpin left him a horse. He journeyed to the United States and encounters the gunslingers Nighthawk and Cinnamon. The hot-headed Nighthawk lynched Craddock after wrongly assuming that he sexually assaulted Cinnamon, but Craddock somehow eludes death to rise again as a ghost.

The Gentleman Ghost learns he must wander the earth until the spirit of his killer moves on to the next plane of existence. Nighthawk and Cinnamon turn out to be the reincarnations of Ancient Egyptian royalty Prince Khufu and Chay-Ara: their souls (due to their exposure to the Thanagarian Nth metal) can never truly pass on. Both are eventually resurrected as Hawkman and Hawkgirl, and the Gentleman Ghost becomes their recurring nemesis during the 1940s. Craddock has over the decades menaced other heroes, including Batman, The Atom, Flash, The New Teen Titans, Max Mercury and Stargirl, but the vengeful ghost always returns to his main foes, the Hawks, sometimes as a foe and sometimes as a friend.

Gentleman Ghost later appears as a member of the Injustice Society.

During the Infinite Crisis storyline, he joins Alexander Luthor Jr.'s Secret Society of Super Villains. He fought Alan Scott and placed him in a coma.

His origin is explored and altered in the pages of JSA #82-87 (2006). The natural son of an abusive father and a poor mother, young Jim Craddock soon slips into a life of crime, making contacts with the supernatural. After a gypsy prophesies that he will be able to transcend death and return to life fighting and killing his enemies on English soil, his villainous career is put to an end when he is captured and sentenced to death by hanging after he is tricked by a woman he is trying to seduce who summons Redcoats. Returning as a ghost, he battles those on JSA, hoping for the prophecy to come true. When the rightful time arrives, the Ghost gains the additional power of summoning vengeful ghosts from his enemies' (the JSA) past, like someone Scott killed with an electrical accident, although this is a fake, and other highwaymen. His plan is foiled by Stargirl, who, as a virgin girl, is impervious to ghostly attacks, an army of ghostly nobles who attack his army, and Wildcat, surprisingly a descendant of the Royal House of England, who decapitates him. Vanquished, he disappears.

Gentleman Ghost is seen as one of the villains sent to retrieve the Get Out of Hell Free card from the Secret Six.

The New 52
In 2011, The New 52 rebooted the DC universe. Gentleman Ghost is still a thief and is not a ghost like his Earth-Two counterpart.

In his first appearance, he steals the Mortis Orb, which has the power to resurrect the dead. Hawkman deduces that Gentleman Ghost is Jim Craddock (whom he knew in a previous incarnation) and Gentleman Ghost confirms it. Gentleman Ghost tells Hawkman he invited him here because the Nth metal drew him to the Mortis Orb. Then, he tells Hawkman he will take him to the orb, but Hawkman refuses, so Gentleman Ghost sends more apparitions after him, Hawkman escapes the building. Then, Gentleman Ghost appears again, saying that the warlock's spell rendered the orb inert years ago, but the Nth Metal broke the spell causing the orb to regain its power. Gentleman Ghost takes the orb, saying that he will use it to transcend death and resurrect himself through the life-force of every man, woman, and child nearby. Then, he disappears and the zombies attacking Hawkman fall apart. Gentleman Ghost begins fully harnessing the orb’s power, creating a portal from which Julius Gates comes out. Gates (demanding the orb) grabs Craddock, while Hawkman takes the orb from him. The portal vanishes with Craddock and Gates inside causing them both to disappear along with the apparitions and zombies. Hawkman drops the Mortis Orb somewhere in Antarctica to keep it from falling into the wrong hands again.

Sometime later, Craddock takes up residence in a New Hampshire called Duskhaven which he operates out of while he robs wealthy socialites of Gotham. When the Midnight Shift apprehends him, he reveals his new origins. Some time in the past, Craddock was a philanderer and drew the ire of a witch, who cursed him, granting his abilities but forcing him to commit criminal acts. He believed the curse would be lifted once the witch died. It was not and he found himself to be immortal.

DC Rebirth
In 2016, DC Comics implemented another relaunch of its books called DC Rebirth, which restored its continuity to a form much as it was prior to "The New 52". When Sebastian Faust goes rogue and steals all the magical items in A.R.G.U.S. storage, Amanda Waller recruits Craddock into a special magic-based team of criminals known as Suicide Squad Black.

Powers, abilities, and equipment
The Gentleman Ghost of Earth-Two relies on various devices to simulate ghost-like capabilities for his criminal capers.

Jim Craddock is a true ghost with paranormal powers far beyond that of ordinary ghosts. In fact, the appearance of his head had been shown as a floating hat, monocle, and transparent face. As the Gentleman Ghost, he can become intangible to pass effortlessly through solid materials, turn completely invisible, and float on air. He has the ability to teleport distances in a few rooms, across states, or other dimensions. Craddock could summon spectral weapons (such as flintlock pistols) or detect psionic energies. Due to Craddock's ghostly form, he can also freeze people with his touch. Around the time of his prophesied revival, he gains spirit magic. This allows him to call upon and control the undead when his mother's ghost spent centuries recruiting them for her son. The Gentleman Ghost possesses expertise in equestrianism and marksmanship. However, his weaknesses are royal nobles, virgins, and the Nth Metal.

Other versions

Kingdom Come
In the Kingdom Come reality, Gentleman Ghost is seen as a patron of a supervillain bar. He is present when Superman appears announcing that he is reforming the Justice League.

Earth 3
On Earth-3, Gentleman Ghost's heroic counterpart is the Pinkerton Ghost. He is seen as a member of the Justice Society All-Stars (a counterpart of the Injustice Society).

In other media

Television
 Gentleman Ghost, referred to as "Gentleman Jim Craddock", appears in The All-New Super Friends Hour episode "Ghost", voiced by Alan Oppenheimer.
 Gentleman Ghost was briefly considered to appear in The New Batman Adventures. When asked about his potential use in the show, producer and writer Paul Dini stated his appearance would be "likely, if we do more contemporary Batman stories". Ultimately, Gentleman Ghost never appeared in the series.
 Gentleman Ghost appears in Justice League Unlimited, voiced by Robin Atkin Downes. This version is a member of Gorilla Grodd's Secret Society.
 Gentleman Ghost appears in Batman: The Brave and the Bold, voiced by Greg Ellis. This version is an infamous highwayman from 19th century London known as Gentleman Jim Craddock, who tries to obtain immortality by offering ten souls to the demon Asteroth in exchange, only to be foiled by Sherlock Holmes, Etrigan, and a time-displaced Batman. After being hanged for his crimes, Craddock's soul is cursed by Asteroth to never leave the Earthly plane, causing him to rise from his grave as Gentleman Ghost and swear revenge on Batman.
 Additionally, an unnamed, heroic, alternate reality version of Gentleman Ghost appears in the episode "Deep Cover for Batman!"
 Gentleman Ghost appears in the DC Super Hero Girls two-part episode "#NightmareInGotham", voiced by Fred Tatasciore.

Film
 Gentleman Ghost appears in The Lego Batman Movie.
 Gentleman Ghost appears in Teen Titans Go! vs. Teen Titans, voiced by "Weird Al" Yankovic.

Video games
 Gentleman Ghost appears in Batman: The Brave and the Bold – The Videogame, voiced again by Greg Ellis.
 Gentleman Ghost appears in DC Universe Online, voiced by Jason Brenizer.
 Gentleman Ghost appears as a playable character in Lego DC Super-Villains, voiced again by Robin Atkin Downes.

See also
 List of Batman family enemies

References

External links
Gentleman Ghost at Comic Vine

Villains in animated television series
Comics characters introduced in 1947
Characters created by Robert Kanigher
Characters created by Joe Kubert
DC Comics characters who can teleport
DC Comics characters who use magic
DC Comics characters with superhuman senses
DC Comics male supervillains
DC Comics supervillains
DC Comics undead characters
Earth-Two
Fictional characters from parallel universes
Fictional characters who can turn intangible
Fictional characters who can turn invisible
Fictional characters with death or rebirth abilities
Fictional characters with dimensional travel abilities
Fictional characters with energy-manipulation abilities
Fictional characters with ice or cold abilities
Fictional characters with immortality
Fictional English people
Fictional gentleman thieves
Fictional ghosts
Fictional murderers
Golden Age supervillains
Undead supervillains